In algebra, a j-multiplicity is a generalization of a Hilbert–Samuel multiplicity. For m-primary ideals, the two notions coincide.

Definition 
Let  be a local Noetherian ring of Krull dimension . Then the j-multiplicity of an ideal I is

References 
Daniel Katz, Javid Validashti, Multiplicities and Rees valuations
 

Commutative algebra